Guidong County is a county in Hunan Province, China, bordering Jiangxi province to the east. It is under the administration of Chenzhou prefecture-level City.

Located on the southeastern margin of the province, it is the easternmost county-level division of Chenzhou City. The county is bordered to the north by Yanling County, to the west by Zixing City, to the south by Rucheng County, to the east by Suichuan, Shangyou and Chongyi Counties of Jiangxi. The county has seven towns and four townships under its jurisdiction, the county seat is Oujiang.

Administrative divisions
7 towns
 Datang
 Oujiang
 Pule
 Qingquan
 Shatian
 Sidu
 Zhaiqian

4 townships
 Dongluo
 Qiaotou
 Qingshan
 Xinfang

Climate

References
www.xzqh.org

External links 

 
County-level divisions of Hunan
Geography of Chenzhou